Tovarich is a 1963 musical play in two acts with book by David Shaw; music by Lee Pockriss and lyrics by Anne Croswell; based on the comedy by Jacques Deval and Robert E. Sherwood.

Productions
The musical opened in New York at The Broadway Theatre on 18 March 1963 then transferred to Majestic Theatre and the Winter Garden Theatre. It ran for a total 264 performances.

The production was directed by Peter Glenville and choreographed by Herbert Ross. The original cast included Vivien Leigh, Jean Pierre Aumont, George S. Irving, Louise Kirtland, Alexander Scourby and Louise Troy. 

Vivien Leigh won the Tony Award for Best Actress in a Musical. Leigh left the production on short notice because of illness; understudy Joan Copeland took over the role October 7, 1963 and she was replaced by Eva Gabor on October 21, 1963.

Songs

 Act I
 "Nitchevo"
 "I Go to Bed"
 "You'll Make an Elegant Butler (I'll Make an Elegant Maid)"¹
 "Stuck With Each Other"
 "Say You'll Stay"
 "You Love Me"
 "Introduction Tango"
 "That Face"
 "Wilkes-Barre, Pa."
 "No! No! No!"
 "A Small Cartel"

 Act II
 "It Used to Be"
 "Make a Friend"
 "The Only One"
 "Uh-Oh!"
 "Managed"
 "I Know the Feeling"
 "All for You"
 "Grande Polonaise"

¹ - music and lyrics by Joan Javits and Philip Springer

Awards and nominations

Original Broadway production

External links
 
 The Guide to Musical Theatre

Broadway musicals
1963 musicals
Musicals based on plays
Tony Award-winning musicals